
Laguna Aricare is a lake in the Beni Department, Bolivia. At an elevation of 180 m, its surface area is 10.33 km².

References

Lakes of Beni Department